Trupanea erasa is a species of tephritid or fruit flies in the genus Trupanea of the family Tephritidae.

Distribution
Peru.

References

Tephritinae
Insects described in 1942
Taxa named by John Russell Malloch
Diptera of South America